Toxorhamphus is a genus of birds in the family Melanocharitidae. They are commonly known as longbills and were once thought to be in the honeyeater family. The genus is endemic to the islands of New Guinea.

Species
It contains the following species:

 Yellow-bellied longbill (Toxorhamphus novaeguineae)
 Slaty-headed longbill (Toxorhamphus poliopterus)

 
Bird genera
Higher-level bird taxa restricted to New Guinea
Taxonomy articles created by Polbot